"First Time" is a song recorded by British-German DJ and record producing duo M-22 and Danish singer Medina. The song was released by 3 Beat Records on 8 December 2017. It reached number 20 on the UK Singles Chart on 13 July 2018, becoming Medina's first entry on the chart since "You and I" in 2009 and her highest-charting single in the United Kingdom.

Music video
An audio-video to accompany the release of "First Time" was first released onto YouTube on 8 December 2017, through 3 Beat's official YouTube account.

Track listing

Charts

Weekly charts

Year-end charts

Certifications

Release history

References

2017 singles
2017 songs
Medina (singer) songs
Songs written by Arlissa